Jasper Diefenbach (born 17 March 1988) is a Dutch male volleyball player. He is part of the Netherlands men's national volleyball team. On club level he plays for the Dutch club VVU.

References

External links
Profile at FIVB.org

1988 births
Living people
Dutch men's volleyball players
Sportspeople from Dordrecht
Dutch expatriate sportspeople in Belgium
Dutch expatriate sportspeople in France
Expatriate volleyball players in Belgium
Expatriate volleyball players in France
21st-century Dutch people